commonly abbreviated as Nintendo R&D2, was a Japanese team within Nintendo that developed software and peripherals. While usually occupied in system operating software and technical support, the team would come back to early development in the 1990s where several new designers got their start at game development, the most famous being Eiji Aonuma who developed Marvelous: Another Treasure Island.

R&D2 was originally led by Masayuki Uemura, who previously worked for Sharp Corporation, using an idea of Sharp's solar technology Uemura's department went on to develop the popular Nintendo beam gun games, selling over 1 million units. Kazuhiko Taniguchi took Uemura's position in 2004. Nintendo R&D2 was later merged into Nintendo SPD.

History 
In the 1970s, Nintendo created the R&D2 department.

In 2004, the department's general manager Masayuki Uemura retired from Nintendo. Following his retirement, he became a professor at the Ritsumeikan University in Kyoto, and served as an advisor to Nintendo Research & Engineering.

Products developed

Electronic games

Video game consoles

Video games

Notes

References

External links
IGN Listing for R&D2

Defunct video game companies of Japan
Japanese companies disestablished in 2004
Nintendo divisions and subsidiaries
Video game companies disestablished in 2004
Video game development companies